Inspector William Monk is a fictional character created by the writer Anne Perry and hero of a series of books.

Monk was born in Northumberland shortly before the accession of Queen Victoria, the son of a fisherman. Before he joined the police, Monk worked as a banker under Arroll Dundas, who became Monk's mentor and taught him how to behave and dress like a gentleman. When Dundas was wrongly convicted of railway fraud, Monk decided he would never again be so powerless against injustice and became a policeman. He was ruthlessly ambitious and quickly climbed the career ladder—while making many enemies along the way.

He had a coach accident in 1856, after which he lost his memory—a fact he kept secret to save his job. After the accident he met Hester Latterly, a Crimean War nurse and they became close. Only Latterly knew about Monk's memory issues.

In the second book, A Dangerous Mourning, Monk was fired from the police force for insubordination and became a private investigator. Lady Callandra Daviott (Hester's best friend) financed his private investigations. Sir Oliver Rathbone was his love rival (he too wanted to marry Hester) and judicial adviser in his case.

In "Dark Assassin," Monk joined the Thames River Police to pay a debt to a friend who died on a previous case. Although he finds the shift from street policing to river policing difficult, he earns the respect of his men and continues on in this position.

Personality 
William Monk is a clever man who wields irony and sarcasm with considerable skill while remaining obstinate, proud, and impulsive. This normally disastrous combination of attributes (for which he was dismissed from the police force) is offset by his intelligence, unswerving sense of justice and humanity to those he deems worthy. He is highly emotional and this passion drives his excellence with the single-minded determination of the obsessed. He will solve the case, he will see the evildoers brought to justice, and he will be fearless in doing so, come what may.

While Monk lives in the Victorian era, his disregard for social conventions (openly suspecting the gentry instead of the servants in A Dangerous Mourning, and consistently ignoring class distinctions) imbues him with the power of a true believer and gives him access to multiple layers of society, which aids his tireless efforts.

Monk series 
Series is listed in internal chronological order, according to the author's website 
 The Face of a Stranger (1990)
 A Dangerous Mourning (1991)
 Defend and Betray (1992)
 A Sudden, Fearful Death (1993)
 The Sins of the Wolf (1994)
 Cain His Brother (1995)
 Weighed in the Balance (1996)
 The Silent Cry (1997)
 A Breach of Promise (alt. title: Whited Sepulchres) (1997)
 The Twisted Root (1999)
 Slaves of Obsession (alt. title: Slaves and Obsession) (2000)
 A Funeral in Blue (2001)
 Death of a Stranger (2002)
 The Shifting Tide (2004)
 Dark Assassin (2006)
 Execution Dock (2009)
 Acceptable Loss (2011)
 A Sunless Sea (2012)
 Blind Justice (2013)
 Blood on the Water (2014)
 Corridors of the Night (2015)
 Revenge in a Cold River (2016)
 An Echo of Murder (2017)
 Dark Tide Rising (2018)

Characters in British novels
Novel series
Fictional historical detectives
Fictional British police detectives
Literary characters introduced in 1990
Fictional private investigators